Tuwat (Touat, Tuat) is a Zenati Berber language. It is spoken by Zenata Berbers in a number of villages in the Tuat region of southern Algeria; notably Tamentit (where it was already practically extinct by 1985) and Tittaf, located south of the Gurara Berber speech area. Ethnologue considers them a single language, "Zenati", but Blench (2006) classifies Gurara as a dialect of Mzab–Wargla and Tuwat as a dialect of the Riff cluster.

References

Berber languages
Languages of Algeria
Riff languages